Omar Daniel Assegaf or better known as Omar Daniel (born 9 April 1995) is an Indonesian actor, presenter, and model. Daniel first plunged into the world of Indonesia's television in 2016 and played as Fahri in the soap opera of SinemArt production titled Anak Jalanan. But he began to be known thanks to his role as Rey in the soap opera Anugerah Cinta. In 2017, Daniel completed his studies at Mercu Buana University and earned his S.IKom (Bachelor of Communication Science).

Biography

Early life
Omar Daniel was born in Surakarta, Central Java as the last of four children. All of his siblings are women, including Aisya Melissa, Hadijah Tania, and Kamila. Daniel comes from the Ba 'Alawi sada family of Arab Hadhrami descent surnamed Assegaf, his father is a private businessman named Ali Reza Assegaf, while his mother was named Farida Achmad. His father was born in Surakarta, but has the blood of Arab, Dutch, and Javanese descent from his grandparents.

Education
Omar Daniel graduated from Senior High School Batik 1 Surakarta in 2013. Furthermore, he continued his education to Jakarta, precisely at the Mercu Buana University. On 26 July 2016, he graduated as Bachelor of Communication Science at Indonesia Convention Exhibition, Bumi Serpong Damai, South Tangerang. Daniel successfully completed his lecture for 3 years 7 months with a GPA of 3.75.

Personal life
Omar Daniel is known to be close to actress Cut Meyriska. The closeness of both begins when they are paired in a similar soap opera titled Putri Titipan Tuhan that aired on SCTV. Even so, the two claimed to be just regular friends and no other special relationship. Daniel admits that he does not want to fabricate personal relationships just to increase his popularity. On 25 January 2018, Daniel was seen accompanied by a woman named Amira while attending Magnum Fashion Giveaway event at The Pallas, Sudirman Central Business District, South Jakarta. But Daniel also confessed that Amira was just a casual close friend.

Career

Before plunging into the world of acting, Daniel first plunge into the world of advertising and Models. One of ads who he starred in were 3 (telecommunications). Although at first he refused an offer to play soap operas, but in the end he accepted it as well. One of the soap operas that make his name soar is Anugerah Cinta, with his role as a Rey figure.

Filmography

Soap opera

References

Footnotes

Works cited

Bibliography

External links
 

1995 births
Living people
Indonesian people of Yemeni descent
Indonesian people of Dutch descent
Indonesian actors
People from Surakarta